The Local Government Act 1972 (c. 70) is an Act of the Parliament of the United Kingdom that reformed local government in England and Wales on 1 April 1974. It was one of the most significant Acts of Parliament to be passed by the Heath Government of 1970–74.

Its pattern of two-tier metropolitan and non-metropolitan county and district councils remains in use today in large parts of England, although the metropolitan county councils were abolished in 1986, and both county and district councils have been replaced with unitary authorities in many areas since the 1990s. In Wales, too, the Act established a similar pattern of counties and districts, but these have since been entirely replaced with a system of unitary authorities. 

Elections were held to the new authorities in 1973, and they acted as "shadow authorities" until the handover date. Elections to county councils were held on 12 April, for metropolitan and Welsh districts on 10 May, and for non-metropolitan district councils on 7 June.

England

Background
Elected county councils had been established in England and Wales for the first time in 1888, covering areas known as administrative counties. Some large towns, known as county boroughs, were politically independent from the counties in which they were physically situated. The county areas were two-tier, with many municipal boroughs, urban districts and rural districts within them, each with its own council.

Apart from the creation of new county boroughs, the most significant change since 1899 (and the establishment of metropolitan boroughs in the County of London) had been the establishment in 1965 of Greater London and its thirty-two London boroughs, covering a much larger area than the previous county of London.  A Local Government Commission for England was set up in 1958 to review local government arrangements throughout the country, and made some changes, such as merging two pairs of small administrative counties to form Huntingdon and Peterborough and Cambridgeshire and Isle of Ely, and creating several contiguous county boroughs in the Black Country.  However, most of the commission's recommendations, such as its proposals to abolish Rutland or to reorganise Tyneside, were ignored in favour of the status quo.

It was generally agreed that there were significant problems with the structure of local government. Despite mergers, there was still a proliferation of small district councils in rural areas, and in the major conurbations the borders had been set before the pattern of urban development had become clear. For example, in the area that was to become the seven boroughs of the metropolitan county of West Midlands, local government was split between three administrative counties (Staffordshire, Warwickshire, and Worcestershire), and eight county boroughs (Birmingham, Coventry, Dudley, Solihull, Walsall, Warley, West Bromwich, and Wolverhampton). Many county boundaries reflected traditions of the Middle Ages or even earlier; industrialisation had created new and very large urban areas like the West Midlands, Liverpool and Manchester which spanned traditional county boundaries and were now often bigger than and far from their traditional county towns.

The Local Government Commission was wound up in 1966, and replaced with a Royal Commission (known as the Redcliffe-Maud commission). In 1969 it recommended a system of single-tier unitary authorities for the whole of England, apart from three metropolitan areas of Merseyside, SELNEC (South East Lancashire and North East Cheshire, now known as Greater Manchester) and West Midlands (Birmingham and the Black Country), which were to have both a metropolitan council and district councils.

This report was accepted by the Labour Party government of the time despite considerable opposition, but the Conservative Party won the June 1970 general election on a manifesto that committed it to a two-tier structure. The new government made Peter Walker and Graham Page the ministers, and quickly dropped the Redcliffe-Maud report. They invited comments from interested parties regarding the previous government's proposals.

The Association of Municipal Corporations, an advocacy group representing the boroughs, responded to Redcliffe-Maud by putting forward a scheme where England outside London would be divided into 13 provinces, with 132 main authorities below that. The AMC argued that the Redcliffe-Maud units would be too far removed from the people they served, and suggested units that in some places were much smaller in size. The Times gave the example of Kent, which under Redcliffe-Maud would have consisted of two unitary authorities, the smaller having a population of 499,000 (as of 1968), while the AMC proposal would divide the same area into seven local authorities, ranging in population from 161,000 to 306,000.

White Paper and Bill

The incoming government's proposals for England were presented in a White Paper published in February 1971. The White Paper substantially trimmed the metropolitan areas, and proposed a two-tier structure for the rest of the country. Many of the new boundaries proposed by the Redcliffe-Maud report were retained in the White Paper. The proposals were in large part based on ideas of the County Councils Association, the Urban District Councils Association and the Rural District Councils Association.

The White Paper outlined principles, including an acceptance of the minimum population of 250,000 for education authorities in the Redcliffe-Maud report, and its findings that the division of functions between town and country had been harmful, but that some functions were better performed by smaller units. The White Paper set out the proposed division of functions between districts and counties, and also suggested a minimum population of 40,000 for districts. The government aimed to introduce a Bill in the 1971/72 session of Parliament for elections in 1973, so that the new authorities could start exercising full powers on 1 April 1974. The White Paper made no commitments on regional or provincial government, since the Conservative government preferred to wait for the Crowther Commission to report.

The proposals were substantially changed with the introduction of the Bill into Parliament in November 1971:

Area 4 (Cleveland) would have had a border with area 2 (Tyne and Wear), cutting area 3 (Durham) off from the coast. Seaham and Easington were to be part of the Sunderland district.
Humberside did not exist in the White Paper. The East Riding was split between area 5 (North Yorkshire) and an area 8 (East Yorkshire). Grimsby and Northern Lindsey were to be part of area 22 (Lincolnshire).
Harrogate and Knaresborough had been included in district 6b (Leeds)
Dronfield in Derbyshire had been included in district 7c (Sheffield)
Area 9 (Cumbria) did not at this stage include the Sedbergh Rural District from Yorkshire
Area 10 (Lancashire) included more parishes from the West Riding of Yorkshire than were eventually included
Area 11 (Merseyside) did not include Southport, but did include Ellesmere Port and Neston
Area 12 (Greater Manchester) lost New Mills and Whaley Bridge (to be with Stockport), and Glossop (to be in Tameside)
The Seisdon Rural District, which formed a narrow peninsula of Staffordshire running between Shropshire and the Black Country county boroughs, would originally have been split three ways, between the Wolverhampton district (15a), area 16 (Shropshire) and area 17 (Worcestershire)
Halesowen would have become part of district 15d (Sandwell) rather than 15c (Dudley)
District 15f (Solihull) would have included part of the Birmingham county borough as well as parishes from Stratford on Avon Rural District
Area 18 (Warwickshire) would have included several parishes from Daventry Rural District in Northamptonshire
Area 20 (Nottinghamshire) would include Long Eaton from Derbyshire
Area 26 (Avon) to have covered a larger area, including Frome
Area 31 (Norfolk) to have covered a large area of East Suffolk, including Beccles, Bungay, Halesworth, Lowestoft, Southwold, Lothingland Rural District, and Wainford Rural District
Area 33 (Oxfordshire) to include Brackley and Brackley Rural District from Northamptonshire
Area 39 (Berkshire) to include Henley-on-Thames and Henley Rural District from Oxfordshire
Area 40 (Surrey) to include Aldershot, Farnborough, Fleet and area from Hampshire

The Bill as introduced also included two new major changes based on the concept of unifying estuaries, through the creation of the county of Humberside on the Humber Estuary, and the inclusion of Harwich and Colchester in Suffolk to unify the Stour Estuary. The latter was removed from the Bill before it became law.  Proposals from Plymouth for a Tamarside county were rejected.  The Bill also provided names for the new counties for the first time.

The main amendments made to the areas during the Bill's passage through Parliament were:

renaming of Malvernshire to Hereford and Worcester (the name "Wyvern" was also suggested)
renaming of Teesside to Cleveland, exclusion of Whitby
renaming of Tyneside to Tyne and Wear
removal of Seaham from Tyne and Wear, keeping it in County Durham
removal of Skelmersdale and Holland from Merseyside – they were to be part of the independent district of Southport, before Southport was included within Merseyside
exclusion of Colchester and area from Suffolk, kept in Essex
exclusion of Newmarket and Haverhill from Cambridgeshire, kept in Suffolk (despite protests of Newmarket UDC, which was happy to see the town transferred to Cambridgeshire)
keeping the Isle of Wight independent of Hampshire
adding part of Lothingland Rural District from Suffolk to Norfolk.

In the Bill as published, the Dorset/Hampshire border was between Christchurch and Lymington.  On 6 July 1972, a government amendment added Lymington to Dorset, which would have had the effect of having the entire Bournemouth conurbation in one county (although the town in Lymington itself does not form part of the built-up area, the borough was large and contained villages which do). The House of Lords reversed this amendment in September, with the government losing the division 81 to 65. In October, the government brought up this issue again, proposing an amendment to put the western part of Lymington borough in Dorset. The amendment was withdrawn.

The government lost divisions in the House of Lords at Report Stage on the exclusion of Wilmslow and Poynton from Greater Manchester and their retention in Cheshire, and also on whether Rothwell should form part of the Leeds or Wakefield districts. (Rothwell had been planned for Wakefield, but an amendment at report stage was proposed by local MP Albert Roberts and accepted by the government, then overturned by the Lords.) Instead, the Wakefield district gained the town of Ossett, which was originally placed in the Kirklees district, following an appeal by Ossett Labour Party.

The government barely won a division in the Lords on the inclusion of Weston-super-Mare in Avon, by 42 to 41.

Two more metropolitan districts were created than were originally in the Bill:
Rochdale and Bury were originally planned to form a single district (dubbed "Botchdale" by local MP Michael Fidler); Rochdale took Middleton from Oldham in compensation.
Knowsley was not originally planned, and was formed from the western part of the planned St Helens district.

As passed, the Act would have included Charlwood and Horley in West Sussex, along with Gatwick Airport. This was reversed by the Charlwood and Horley Act 1974, passed just before the Act came into force. Charlwood was made part of the Mole Valley district and Horley part of Reigate and Banstead. Gatwick Airport was still transferred.

Although willing to compromise on exact boundaries, the government stood firm on the existence or abolition of county councils. The Isle of Wight (originally scheduled to be merged back into Hampshire as a district) was the only local campaign to succeed, and also the only county council in England to violate the 250,000 minimum for education authorities. The government bowed to local demand for the island to retain its status in October 1972, moving an amendment in the Lords to remove it from Hampshire, Lord Sanford noting that "nowhere else is faced with problems of communication with its neighbours which are in any way comparable."

Protests from Rutland and Herefordshire failed, although Rutland was able to secure its treatment as a single district despite not meeting the stated minimum population of 40,000 for districts. Several metropolitan boroughs fell under the 250,000 limit, including three of Tyne and Wear's five boroughs (North Tyneside, South Tyneside and Gateshead), and the four metropolitan boroughs that had resulted from the splitting of the proposed Bury/Rochdale and Knowsley/St Helens boroughs.

Wales
The background of the act was substantially different in Wales. The Redcliffe-Maud Commission had not considered Wales, which had been the subject of the Welsh Office proposals in the 1960s. A White Paper was published in 1967 on the subject of Wales, based on the findings of the 1962 report of the Local Government Commission for Wales. The White Paper proposed five counties, and thirty-six districts. The county boroughs of Swansea, Cardiff and Newport would be retained, but the small county borough of Merthyr Tydfil would become a district. The proposed counties were as follows

Dyfed – West Wales – Cardiganshire, Carmarthenshire, Pembrokeshire
Glamorgan – South Wales
Gwent – South-East Wales – Monmouthshire (also including Rhymney valley from Glamorgan)
Gwynedd – North Wales – Anglesey, Caernarvonshire, Denbighshire, Flintshire, Merionethshire
Powys – Mid Wales – Montgomeryshire, Radnorshire, Breconshire

Implementation of reform in Wales was not immediate, pending decisions on the situation in England, and a new Secretary of State, George Thomas, announced changes to the proposals in November 1968. The large northern county of Gwynedd was to be split to form two counties (creating Gwynedd in the west and Clwyd in the east) with various alterations to the districts. The Redcliffe-Maud report led to a reconsideration of the plans, especially with respect to Glamorgan and Monmouthshire, and a March 1970 White Paper proposed three unitary authorities for South Wales, based on Cardiff, Swansea and Newport.<ref>"Local Government Reorganisation in Glamorgan and Monmouthshire</ref>

After the 1970 general election, the new Conservative government published a Consultative Document in February 1971, at the same time as the English White Paper. The proposals were similar to the Labour proposals of 1968, except that the county boroughs were instead two-tier districts, and that Glamorgan was to be subdivided into West Glamorgan and East Glamorgan, making 7 counties and 36 districts.

In the Bill as introduced Glamorgan had been split into three authorities: with East Glamorgan further subdivided into a Mid Glamorgan covering the valleys and South Glamorgan. The decision to split East Glamorgan further left South Glamorgan with only two districts (one of which was the Conservative-controlled Cardiff, who had requested the split) and Mid Glamorgan one of the poorest areas in the country. The Labour-controlled Glamorgan County Council strongly opposed this move, placing adverts in newspapers calling for Glamorgan to be saved from a "carve up", and demanding that the east/west split be retained. The resulting South Glamorgan was the only Welsh county council the Conservatives ever controlled (from 1977 to 1981).

One of the effects of the Act was to confirm the area of Monmouthshire as part of Wales. Ambiguity as to the status of Monmouthshire had been introduced by legislation in the 16th and 17th centuries, and by the gradual cultural anglicisation of some eastern parts of the county. By the late 19th century the area was often treated in legislation as one with Wales, using the terminology "Wales and Monmouthshire", although it remained legally part of England.

Apart from the new Glamorgan authorities, all the names of the new Welsh counties were in the Welsh language, with no English equivalent. With the exception of Clwyd (which was named after the River Clwyd) the names of the counties were taken from ancient British kingdoms.  Welsh names were also used for many of the Welsh districts. There were no metropolitan counties and, unlike in England, the Secretary of State could not create future metropolitan counties there under the Act.

The Act

After much comment, the proposals were introduced as the Local Government Bill into Parliament soon after the start of the 1971–1972 session.

In the Commons it passed through Standing Committee D, who debated the Bill in fifty-one sittings from 25 November 1971, to 20 March 1972.

The Act abolished previous existing local government structures, and created a two-tier system of counties and districts everywhere. Some of the new counties were designated metropolitan counties, containing metropolitan boroughs instead. The allocation of functions differed between the metropolitan and the non-metropolitan areas (the so-called 'shire counties') – for example, education and social services were the responsibility of the shire counties, but in metropolitan areas was given to the districts. The distribution of powers was slightly different in Wales than in England, with libraries being a county responsibility in England—but in Wales districts could opt to become library authorities themselves. One key principle was that education authorities (non-metropolitan counties and metropolitan districts), were deemed to need a population base of 250,000 in order to be viable.

Although called two-tier, the system was really three-tier, as it retained civil parish councils, although in Wales they were renamed community councils. Within districts some inconsistency prevailed.  For example, in Welwyn Hatfield District in Hertfordshire, which comprised Welwyn Garden City, Hatfield and Old Welwyn, Hatfield retained a civil parish council, its 'town council' which could act alone in some matters such as town twinning, whereas Welwyn Garden City did not and therefore had no separate representation.

The Act introduced 'agency', where one local authority (usually a district) could act as an agent for another authority. For example, since road maintenance was split depending upon the type of road, both types of council had to retain engineering departments. A county council could delegate its road maintenance to the district council if it was confident that the district was competent. Some powers were specifically excluded from agency, such as education.

The Act abolished various historic relics such as aldermen.  The office previously known as sheriff was retitled high sheriff. Many existing boroughs that were too small to constitute a district, but too large to constitute a civil parish, were given charter trustees.

Most provisions of the Act came into force at midnight on 1 April 1974. Elections to the new councils had already been held, in 1973, and the new authorities were already up and running as 'shadow authorities', following the example set by the London Government Act 1963.

The new local government areas

The Act specified the composition and names of the English and Welsh counties, and the composition of the metropolitan and Welsh districts.  It did not specify any names of districts, nor indeed the borders of the non-metropolitan districts in England – these were specified by Statutory Instrument after the passing of the Act.  A Boundary Commission, provided for in the Act, had already begun work on dividing England into districts whilst the Bill was still going through Parliament.The English Non-metropolitan Districts (Names) Order 1973 (SI 1973/551)The Districts in Wales (Names) Order (SI 1973/34)

In England there were 45 counties and 296 districts, in Wales there were 8 and 37. Six of the English counties were designated as metropolitan counties. The new English counties were based clearly on the traditional ones, albeit with several substantial changes. The 13 historic counties of Wales, however, were abandoned entirely for administrative purposes, and 8 new ones instituted.

The Act substituted the new counties "for counties of any other description" for purposes of law. This realigned the boundaries of ceremonial and judicial counties used for lieutenancy, custodes rotulorum, shrievalty, commissions of the peace and magistrates' courts to the metropolitan and non-metropolitan counties. The Act also extended the rights of the Duchy of Lancaster to appoint Lord-Lieutenants for the shrunken Lancashire along with all of Greater Manchester and Merseyside.

In England before the passing of the Act there had been 1086 rural and urban districts (including non-county boroughs) and 79 county boroughs. The number of districts was reduced about fourfold. Most of the new districts were groups of the whole areas of former districts, although 64 rural districts were split between new districts, and there were eleven urban districts or boroughs which saw their territory split between new districts: Teesside County Borough, Whitley Bay Municipal Borough, Ashton-in-Makerfield Urban District, Billinge and Winstanley Urban District, Golborne Urban District, Lakes Urban District, Queensbury and Shelf Urban District, Ramsbottom Urban District, Seaton Valley Urban District, Thurrock Urban District, and Turton Urban District.

England
 Metropolitan counties 

Metropolitan districts

 Non-metropolitan counties 

Non-metropolitan districts

A list of non-metropolitan districts can be found at List of English districts.  The Local Government Boundary Commission originally proposed 278 non-metropolitan districts in April 1972 (still working with the county boundaries found in the Bill).  A further eighteen districts were added in the final proposals of November 1972, which were then ordered.

The splits were as follows (in most cases the splits were not exact, and many other changes to the borders of the districts took place at this time)

Devon: Torridge/North Devon
Dorset : Weymouth and Portland/Purbeck, North Dorset/East Dorset
Durham : Wear Valley/Teesdale
Hereford and Worcester : Hereford/South Herefordshire/Leominster
Humberside: Holderness/North Wolds
Isle of Wight: South Wight/Medina
Lancashire: Hyndburn/Rossendale
Leicestershire : Rutland/Melton, Harborough/Oadby and Wigston
Lincolnshire: Boston/South Holland
Northamptonshire: Daventry/South Northamptonshire
Northumberland : Berwick-upon-Tweed/Alnwick
Shropshire : Oswestry/North Shropshire, Bridgnorth/South Shropshire
Somerset: Taunton Deane/West Somerset
Suffolk: Forest Heath

The new district in Suffolk was necessitated by the decision to keep Newmarket in Suffolk; which would otherwise have become part of the East Cambridgeshire district.

Isles of Scilly
Section 265 of the Act allowed for the continuation of the local government arrangements for the Isles of Scilly. The Isles of Scilly Rural District Council became the Council of the Isles of Scilly, and certain services were to continue to be provided by Cornwall County Council as provided by order made by the Secretary of State, although the Isles were not technically in Cornwall before or after 1974.

Wales

 New counties 

 New districts 

Map

Elections

Elections to the new authorities were held on three different Thursdays in 1973.  Each new county and district was divided into electoral divisions, known as wards in the districts.  For county councils, each electoral division elected one member; for metropolitan district councils, each ward elected three members; and wards in non-metropolitan districts could elect a varying number of members.  There was not sufficient time to conduct a full warding arrangement so a temporary system was used: in some county councils electoral divisions elected multiple councillors.

County councils were set on a four-year cycle of elections of all members, and the next elections were in 1977.  Metropolitan district councils elected one councillor for each seat in the three other years, starting in 1975.  Non-metropolitan districts had a general election again in 1976, and could subsequently either conduct elections of the whole council or by-thirds. Schedule 3 provided that for each metropolitan ward, the councillor for who obtained the fewest votes in the 1973 election would retire in 1975, the next fewest in 1976, and the others in 1978, setting up the cycle.  If equal numbers of votes were obtained, or ward elections in 1973 had been uncontested, the decision would be made by lot.

Division of functions
Health care and water supply / sanitation were assigned to new, separate, non-elected authorities.

The remaining functions previously exercised by local authorities were distributed broadly as follows:

In many areas both authorities had some powers, and certain Welsh districts were allowed greater powers by the Secretary of State.

Reaction
The system established by the Act was the object of some criticism. One major controversy was the failure to reform local government finance. Having lost office at the general election of February 1974, Graham Page, the minister who had piloted the Act through Parliament, condemned the existing system of rates and grants. His successor as Minister for the Environment, Tony Crosland said that he would be re-examining the rates system, while the Association of Metropolitan Authorities sought the establishment of a royal commission to consider the matter.

The two-tier structure established was also seen as problematic. In particular, the division of planning between districts and counties was a source of friction between the new councils. Thamesdown Borough Council called for a further reform and complete abolition of counties as they felt Wiltshire County Council was unable to respond to the needs of an expanding urban area. Further complaints surrounded the loss of water supply and sewerage powers to regional water authorities created by the Water Act 1973. This was felt to reduce the ability of district councils to plan new housing developments. It was also felt that the boundaries of the metropolitan counties were too tightly drawn, leaving out much of the suburban areas of the conurbations. The leading article in The Times on the day the Act came into effect noted that the new arrangement is a compromise which seeks to reconcile familiar geography which commands a certain amount of affection and loyalty, with the scale of operations on which modern planning methods can work effectively.

There was some criticism of county boundary changes. A campaign was mounted to return the Uffington White Horse to Berkshire, and a bonfire was lit at the site by protestors as the Act came into effect. The campaigners claimed 10,000 signatures in favour of diverting the county boundary to include the "Berkshire White Horse". The calls were rejected by the local MP, Airey Neave, who pointed out that the horse predated county boundaries, and by the chairman of the Vale of White Horse District Council. Professor Anthony Fletcher, of the Department of Medieval History of the University of Sheffield, suggested that the new councils place signs at the boundaries of ancient counties. The removal of Gatwick Airport and the surrounding area from Surrey into West Sussex met some fierce local opposition with the result that the parishes of Horley and Charlwood were subsequently returned to Surrey in the eponymous Charlwood and Horley Act 1974, leaving the airport to stay in West Sussex.

Some of the reaction against the Act was motivated by opposition to loss of local control.  The county borough councils regretted the loss of their independent status.  Criticism of the Act also centred on the size of the new districts. The new Minister, whose party had opposed the reforms in opposition, hoped that "it will be more efficient – but it could easily become more remote"''. In order to combat this, Crosland was considering the creation of "neighbourhood councils" in unparished areas of the new districts. The names of some of the new authorities also caused controversy. At no point were local populations consulted about the changes.

The two arguably most loathed new counties created were Humberside and Avon.  Humberside united the north and south banks of the River Humber – in theory at least promoting cooperation of the ports of Kingston-upon-Hull, Grimsby and Immingham – carving territory out of the East Riding of Yorkshire and of northern Lindsey respectively.  Avon lumped Bristol, formerly a county borough within Gloucestershire, together with Bath, a former county borough in Somerset.  Both these creations were to disappear in further local government reforms in the 1990s.

Amendment and adaptation
The system established by the Act was not to last. In England a series of incremental measures amended it. First, the county councils of the metropolitan counties, as well as the Greater London Council, were abolished in 1986 by Margaret Thatcher's government with the Local Government Act 1985, effectively re-establishing county borough status for the metropolitan boroughs. Second, a review of local government outside the metropolitan counties was announced in 1989. The local government reform in the 1990s led to the creation of many new unitary authorities, and the complete abolition of Avon, Cleveland, Hereford and Worcester and Humberside. Names such as Herefordshire and the East Riding of Yorkshire reappeared as local government entities, although often with new boundaries. Several former county boroughs such as Derby, Leicester and Stoke-on-Trent regained unitary status. Additionally, another wave of unitary authorities was formed in 2009.

In Wales there was a more radical change in policy with the two-tier system entirely abolished in 1996, and replaced with the current principal areas of Wales. The 1974 counties in Wales have been retained as preserved counties for various purposes, notably as ceremonial counties, albeit with substantive border revisions.

See also

Local Government Boundary Commission for England (1972)
Local Government Act (Northern Ireland) 1972

References

External links
Text of the Act

United Kingdom Acts of Parliament 1972
Local government legislation in England and Wales
Acts of the Parliament of the United Kingdom concerning England and Wales
1972 in England
1972 in Wales
October 1972 events in the United Kingdom